Abyshevo may refer to:

Abyshevo, Kemerovo Oblast
Abyshevo, Udmurtia